Tasersuaq ( old spelling: Taserssuaq) is a large lake in the Qeqqata municipality in central-western Greenland. The name of the lake means large lake in the Greenlandic language, and is a common name shared by several lakes in the country.

Geography 

In the northwest the lake is bounded by tall mountains of the Pingu mountain group. The range flattens considerably towards the east in the area of Kangaamiut dike swarm north of Kangerlussuaq, due to pressure exerted by the Greenland ice sheet for long periods in the past. The eastern end of the lake is located just west of the Tarajornitsut highland.

References

Panorama 

Lakes of Greenland
ceb:Tasersuaq (lanaw sa Qeqqata, lat 67,13, long -53,05)
sv:Tasersuaq (sjö i Grönland, Qeqqata, lat 67,13, long -53,05)